Mudassar Aziz is an Indian film director, screenwriter, producer and lyricist.

Filmography

References

External links

Hindi-language film directors
Indian male screenwriters
Living people
Place of birth missing (living people)
1983 births